Casper van Uden (born 22 July 2001) is a Dutch cyclist, who currently rides for UCI WorldTeam .

On 1st August 2022 he joined  on a contract that lasts until the end of 2024.

Major results

2018
 4th La Philippe Gilbert Juniors
 5th Bernaudeau Junior
2019
 1st Kuurne–Brussel–Kuurne Juniors
 1st Points classification, Course de la Paix Juniors
 3rd Time trial, National Junior Road Championships
 3rd Johan Museeuw Classic
 6th Overall Keizer der Juniores
 8th Road race, European Junior Road Championships
 8th La Route des Géants
2020
 1st Stage 2b (TTT) Ronde de l'Isard
2021
 1st Ronde van de Achterhoek
 1st Stage 2 (TTT) Tour de l'Avenir
 2nd Paris–Tours Espoirs
 3rd Road race, National Under-23 Road Championships
 3rd Overall Course de Solidarność et des Champions Olympiques
1st Stages 3 & 5
 9th Overall Orlen Nations Grand Prix
2022
 Tour de l'Avenir
1st  Points classification
1st Prologue (TTT)
 1st Stage 4 Tour de Bretagne
 4th Scheldeprijs
 5th Overall Tour de Normandie
1st Stages 2 & 4
 8th Münsterland Giro
2023
 3rd Milano–Torino

References

External links

2001 births
Living people
Dutch male cyclists
People from Schiedam